Now That's What I Call Music! 22 may refer to at least two different "Now That's What I Call Music!"-series albums, including:

 Now That's What I Call Music! 22 (U.K. series), released in 1992
 Now That's What I Call Music! 22 (U.S. series), released in 2006

See also
 Now That's What I Call Music! discography